This Is All I Ask is an album by Tony Bennett, released in 1963. It reached number 24 on the Billboard 200.

Track listing
"Keep Smiling at Trouble" (Buddy G. DeSylvia, Al Jolson, Lewis E. Gensler) – 2:08
"Autumn in Rome" (Sammy Cahn, Paul Weston, Alessandro Cicognini) – 2:19
"True Blue Lou" (Richard A. Whiting, Leo Robin, Sam Coslow) – 2:46
"The Way That I Feel" – 2:58
"This Is All I Ask" (Gordon Jenkins) – 3:17
"The Moment of Truth" (Tex Satterwhite, Frank Scott) – 2:14
"Got Her Off My Hands" – 2:04
"Sandy's Smile" – 3:13
"Long About Now" – 2:45
"Young and Foolish" – 3:26
"Tricks" – 1:52
"On the Other Side of the Tracks" (Cy Coleman, Carolyn Leigh) – 3:46

Recorded April 22, 1963 (#1–2, 10, 12), April 24, 1963 (#3, 6–7), April 26, 1963 (#4–5, 8–9, 11).

Personnel
Tony Bennett – vocals
Ralph Sharon – piano
Chico Hamilton – drums (#11)
Ralph Burns – arranger, conductor
Unidentified chorus and orchestra

References

1963 albums
Albums arranged by Ralph Burns
Albums conducted by Ralph Burns
Columbia Records albums
Tony Bennett albums